The men's road race H4 cycling event at the 2020 Summer Paralympics took place on 1 September 2021, at the Fuji Speedway in Tokyo. 10 riders competed in the event.

The H4 classification is for paraplegics with impairment from T11 down, and amputees unable to knee. These riders will operate using a hand-operated cycle.

Results
The event took place on 1 September 2021, at 14:15:

References

Men's road race H4